UPGMA (unweighted pair group method with arithmetic mean) is a simple agglomerative (bottom-up) hierarchical clustering method. The method is generally attributed to Sokal and Michener.

The UPGMA method is similar to its weighted variant, the WPGMA method.

Note that the unweighted term indicates that all distances contribute equally to each average that is computed and does not refer to the math by which it is achieved. Thus the simple averaging in WPGMA produces a weighted result and the proportional averaging in UPGMA produces an unweighted result (see the working example).

Algorithm
The UPGMA algorithm constructs a rooted tree (dendrogram) that reflects the structure present in a pairwise similarity matrix (or a dissimilarity matrix).
At each step, the nearest two clusters are combined into a higher-level cluster.

The UPGMA algorithm produces rooted dendrograms and requires a constant-rate assumption - that is, it assumes an ultrametric tree in which the distances from the root to every branch tip are equal. When the tips are molecular data (i.e., DNA, RNA and protein) sampled at the same time, the ultrametricity assumption becomes equivalent to assuming a molecular clock.

Working example
This working example is based on a JC69 genetic distance matrix computed from the 5S ribosomal RNA sequence alignment of five bacteria: Bacillus subtilis, Bacillus stearothermophilus, Lactobacillus viridescens, Acholeplasma modicum, and Micrococcus luteus.

First step

 First clustering
Let us assume that we have five elements  and the following matrix  of pairwise distances between them :

 First branch length estimation
This corresponds to the expectation of the ultrametricity hypothesis.

 First distance matrix update
Bold values in  correspond to the new distances, calculated by averaging distances between each element of the first cluster  and each of the remaining elements:

Second step

 Second clustering
We now reiterate the three previous steps, starting from the new distance matrix 

 Second branch length estimation

We deduce the missing branch length:
  (see the final dendrogram)

 Second distance matrix update 
Bold values in  correspond to the new distances, calculated by proportional averaging:

Similarly:

Proportional averaging therefore gives equal weight to the initial distances of matrix . This is the reason why the method is unweighted, not with respect to the mathematical procedure but with respect to the initial distances.

Third step
 Third clustering
We again reiterate the three previous steps, starting from the updated distance matrix .

 Third branch length estimation

 Third distance matrix update

Final step

The final  matrix is:

We deduce the two remaining branch lengths:

The UPGMA dendrogram

The dendrogram is now complete. It is ultrametric because all tips ( to ) are equidistant from  :

Comparison with other linkages 
Alternative linkage schemes include single linkage clustering, complete linkage clustering, and WPGMA average linkage clustering. Implementing a different linkage is simply a matter of using a different formula to calculate inter-cluster distances during the distance matrix update steps of the above algorithm. Complete linkage clustering avoids a drawback of the alternative single linkage clustering method - the so-called chaining phenomenon, where clusters formed via single linkage clustering may be forced together due to single elements being close to each other, even though many of the elements in each cluster may be very distant to each other. Complete linkage tends to find compact clusters of approximately equal diameters.

Uses
 In ecology, it is one of the most popular methods for the classification of sampling units (such as vegetation plots) on the basis of their pairwise similarities in relevant descriptor variables (such as species composition). For example, it has been used to understand the trophic interaction between marine bacteria and protists.
 In bioinformatics, UPGMA is used for the creation of phenetic trees (phenograms). UPGMA was initially designed for use in protein electrophoresis studies, but is currently most often used to produce guide trees for more sophisticated algorithms. This algorithm is for example used in sequence alignment procedures, as it proposes one order in which the sequences will be aligned. Indeed, the guide tree aims at grouping the most similar sequences, regardless of their evolutionary rate or phylogenetic affinities, and that is exactly the goal of UPGMA
 In phylogenetics, UPGMA assumes a constant rate of evolution (molecular clock hypothesis) and that all sequences were sampled at the same time, and is not a well-regarded method for inferring relationships unless this assumption has been tested and justified for the data set being used. Notice that even under a 'strict clock', sequences sampled at different times should not lead to an ultrametric tree.

Time complexity
Fionn Murtagh presented an  time and space algorithm.

See also 
Neighbor-joining
Cluster analysis
Single-linkage clustering
Complete-linkage clustering
Hierarchical clustering
Models of DNA evolution
Molecular clock

References

External links 
UPGMA clustering algorithm implementation in Ruby (AI4R)
Example calculation of UPGMA using a similarity matrix
Example calculation of UPGMA using a distance matrix

Bioinformatics algorithms
Computational phylogenetics
Cluster analysis algorithms
Phylogenetics